The All-Democratic Agricultural Front (PAME) was an electoral left-wing coalition which was formed to contest the 1961 Greek legislative election. The coalition elected 24 MPs.

Members to the coalition were:
United Democratic Left, the biggest left-wing party in Greece 
National Agricultural Party, a small party who founded by centre-left politicians

Political parties established in 1961
1963 disestablishments in Greece
Defunct political party alliances in Greece
Political parties disestablished in 1963
1961 establishments in Greece
United Democratic Left